La Esmeralda (Ye'kuana:  or ) is a small settlement in and the capital of Alto Orinoco Municipality in Venezuela’s  Amazonas State. The name means “the emerald”.  It is located on the shore of the Orinoco river, only 9 miles from the Casiquiare canal bifurcation that links it to the Amazon River.

The settlement contains about a hundred homes, a school, an airfield and a military outpost.

Geography
It is located on the shore of the Orinoco river, only 9 miles from the Casiquiare canal bifurcation that links it to the Amazon River.

Climate
La Esmeralda has a tropical rainforest climate (Af) with heavy to very heavy rainfall year-round.

References

External links 

 General information about Amazonas state in Spanish from the national government

Populated places in Amazonas (Venezuelan state)